Kenelm Rees McCloughin (18 August 1884 – 26 September 1915) was an English first-class cricketer and British Army officer.

Life and military career
McCloughin was born at Bombay in British India to Thomas John McCloughin and his wife, Mary Kathleen McCloughin. He was educated in England at Dulwich College, living with an aunt at Camberwell. From Dulwich he attended the Royal Military Academy, Woolwich, graduating into the Royal Garrison Artillery as a second lieutenant in December 1903. While in India he transferred to the British Indian Army, serving with the 14th King George's Own Ferozepore Sikhs. He was promoted to the rank of lieutenant in November 1908, with seniority to October 1905. While in India, he made his debut in first-class cricket for the Europeans against the Parsees at Poona in the 1909–10 Bombay Presidency Match. He was promoted to the rank of captain in December 1912. 

While in England on leave in 1914, he made four appearances in first-class cricket, appearing twice for the Free Foresters against Oxford University and Cambridge University, as well as appearing once each for the British Army cricket team against Cambridge University, and for L. G. Robinson's XI against Oxford University. In five first-class matches, McCloughlin scored 158 runs at an average of 17.55. His highest score of 57 came for the Free Foresters against Cambridge University. He was still on leave in England when the First World War began in July, with McCloughlin transferring to the 11 Battalion, Royal Scots. He was promoted to the temporary rank of major in October 1914, before going to France in March 1915. While there he briefly served with the 15th Ludhiana Sikhs, before returning to the Royal Scots. He was killed in action at the Hohenzollern Redoubt during a German counter-attack on the second day of the Battle of Loos on 26 September 1915.

References

External links

1884 births
1915 deaths
Cricketers from Mumbai
People educated at Dulwich College
Graduates of the Royal Military Academy, Woolwich
Royal Garrison Artillery officers
British Indian Army officers
English cricketers
Europeans cricketers
Free Foresters cricketers
British Army cricketers
L. G. Robinson's XI cricketers
Royal Scots officers
British Army personnel of World War I
British military personnel killed in World War I
Indian Army personnel of World War I
Military personnel of British India